Bengaluru Vijaya Radha (15 August 1948 – 10 September 2017), commonly known as B. V. Radha, was an Indian actress and film producer. She began her career in the 1964 Kannada film Navakoti Narayana. She went on to play mostly supporting roles in over 300 films, 250 of which were in Kannada, and the rest in Tamil, Telugu, Malayalam, Tulu and Hindi.

She was married to film director K. S. L. Swamy. Following her career in cinema, she associated herself with theatre, performing plays with her troupe, Natavranda. Recognizing her contribution to theatre and cinema, Radha was awarded the Kanaka Ratna Award by Kaginele Kanaka Guru Peetha, a spiritual and cultural center, in 2010. She was credited as Kumari Radha in Tamil industry.

Early life and career
Radha was born as Rajalakshmi in 1948 into a farming family. Interested in becoming an actress, she quit school to enter cinema. Her debut role came in the 1964 Kannada film Navakoti Narayana, in which Rajkumar played the lead role. Her most notable role in Tamil films was Thazampoo in 1966. She would then go on to act alongside other top actors in the south Indian cinema in the 1960s and 1970s, such as M.G. Ramachandran, Sivaji Ganesan, N. T. Rama Rao, Gemini Ganesan, Akkineni Nageswara Rao and Jaishankar.

Death 
Radha died on 10 September 2017, due to heart attack.

Partial filmography

Kannada

 Navakoti Narayana (1964)
 Thoogudeepa (1966)
 Premamayi (1966)
 Kiladi Ranga (1966)
 Deva Maanava (1966)
 Rajadurgada Rahasya (1967)
 Onde Balliya Hoogalu (1967)
 Manasiddare Marga (1967)
 Lagna Pathrike (1967)
 Simha Swapna (1968) as Menaka
 Manku Dinne (1968)
 Manassakshi (1968)
 Hannele Chiguridaga (1968)
 Gandhinagara (1968)
 Bhagyada Bagilu (1968)
 Bhagya Devathe (1968)
 Bangalore Mail (1968)
 Bedi Bandavalu (1968)
 Attegondu Kaala Sosegondu Kaala (1968)
 Mukunda Chandra (1969)
 Mayor Muthanna (1969)
 Makkale Manege Manikya (1969)
 Choori Chikkanna (1969)
 Bhale Raja (1969)
 Rangamahal Rahasya (1970) as Miss Sheela
 Namma Mane (1970)
 Mooru Muttugalu (1970)
 Modala Rathri (1970)
 Lakshmi Saraswathi (1970)
 Gejje Pooje (1970)
 Bhale Jodi (1970)
 Arishina Kumkuma (1970)
 Anireekshitha (1970)
 Aaru Mooru Ombathu (1970)
 Bhale Adrushtavo Adrushta (1970)
 Anugraha (1970)
 Amarabharathi (1971)
 Anugraha (1971)
 Naguva Hoovu (1971)
 Bangaarada Manushya (1972)
 Kranti Veera (1972)
 Yaava Janmada Maitri (1972)
 Nanda Gokula (1972)
 Jwala Mohini (1973)
 CID 72 (1973)
 Devaru Kotta Thangi (1973 film) (1973)
 Mahadeshwara Pooja Phala (1974)
 Shubhamangala (1975)
 Mane Belaku (1975)
 Banashankari (1977)
 Mugdha Manava (1977)
 Pavana Ganga (1977)
 Nagara Hole (1977)
 Muthaide Bhagya (1983)
 Chinna (1994 film) (1994)
 Ibbara Naduve Muddina Aata (1996)
 Cheluva (1997)
 Kalavida (1997)
 Simhada Mari (1997)
 Thutta Mutta (1998)
 Hoomale (1998)
 Gadibidi Krishna (1998)
 Snehaloka (1999)
 Partha (2003)
 Ajju (2004)
 Thandege Thakka Maga (2006)

Tamil: Credited as Kumari Radha
 Needhikkuppin Paasam (1963) as Jaya
 Thazhampoo (1965) as Kaveri
 Yaar Nee? (1966) as Rama
 Kathal Paduthum Padu (1966)
 Kadhalithal Podhuma (1967) as Manju's sister
 Naan (1967)
 Naan Yaar Theriyuma (1967)
 Pen Endral Pen (1967)
  Rajathi (1967)
 Sundharamoorthi Nayanar (1967)
  Nimirndhu Nil (1968)
 Sathiyam Thavaradhey (1968)
 Neeyum Naanum (1968)
 Ponnu Mappillai (1969)
 Thanga Surangam (1969)
 CID Shankar (1970) as Rama

Telugu
 Aame Evaru? (1966)

Malayalam: Credited as Kumari Radha
 Bhakta Kuchela (1961) as Dancer

References

External links
 

1948 births
2017 deaths
Actresses from Bangalore
Kannada actresses
Indian film actresses
Actresses in Kannada cinema
Actresses in Tamil cinema
Actresses in Telugu cinema
Actresses in Malayalam cinema
Actresses in Hindi cinema
Kannada film producers
20th-century Indian actresses
21st-century Indian actresses
Film producers from Bangalore
Indian women film producers
Businesswomen from Karnataka
20th-century Indian businesspeople
20th-century Indian businesswomen
Recipients of the Rajyotsava Award 2003